In Arabic names, a  ("attribution"), also rendered as  or , is an adjective indicating the person's place of origin, tribal affiliation, or ancestry, used at the end of the name and occasionally ending in the suffix -i for males and -iyyah for females. , originally an Arabic word, has been passed to many other languages such as Turkish, Persian, Bengali and Urdu.

In Arabic usage, that pronunciation occurs when the word is uttered in its construct state only.

The practice has been adopted in Iranian names and South Asian Muslim names.  The  can at times become a surname.

Original use

A  "relation" is a grammatical term referring to the suffixation of masculine -iyy, feminine -iyyah to a word to make it an adjective. As an example, the word ‘Arabiyy means "Arab, related to Arabic, Arabian".  forms are very common in Arabic names.

Use in onomastics
Patronymics may be long as they may include all known forefathers. When a name is simplified to one or two ancestors, it may become confusing to distinguish from other similar names; in such cases, the  may be added as an additional specifier.

A  is usually prefixed by the definite article 'al-''' and can take a number of forms:

 Places 

Al-Albani, related to or from Albania e.g. Muhammad Nasiruddin al-Albani.
Al-Afghani, related to or from Afghanistan
Al-Almani, related to or from Germany
Al-Amriki, related to or from America
Al-Armani, related to or from Greater Armenia or Armenians
Al Yrifani, related to or from Yerevan
Al Baghdadi, related to or from the city of Baghdad, e.g. Al-Khatib al-Baghdadi, Junayd al-Baghdadi.
al-Britani, related to or from the UK
Al Busnawi, related to or from Bosnia, e.g. Matrakçı Nasuh al-Busnawi. 
Al-Dimashqi, related to or from the city of Damascus e.g. Al-Dimashqi (geographer), Abu al-Fadl Ja'far ibn 'Ali al-Dimashqi, Abu al-Fadl Ja'far ibn 'Ali al-Dimashqi.
Al Himsi, related to or from the city of Homs e.g. Qustaki al-Himsi, Ibn Na'ima al-Himsi.
Al Balushi, related to or from the region of Balochistan e.g. Azan Al-Balushi, Talal Al-Bloushi, Mai Al Balushi, Aisha Al Balushi
Faridi, related to or from the region of Greater Faridpur in Bangladesh e.g. Abdul Haque Faridi
Al Filisṭīnī, related to or from the region of Palestine e.g. Abu Qatada al-Filistini.
Al Masri, related to or from Egypt. e.g. Taher al-Masri, Abu Hamza al-Masri.
Al Najdi, related to or from the region of Najd in Saudi Arabia  e.g. Qutaybah al-Najdi
Al Tihami, related to or from the region of Tihamah in Saudi Arabia.
Al Hijazi, related to or from the region of Hijaz in Saudi Arabia.  e.g. Amal Hijazi, Farouk Hijazi, Abu'l Abbas al-Hijazi
El Djezairi, related to or from Algeria. e.g. Abdelkader El Djezairi.
Al Kairouani, related to or from the city of Kairouan in Tunisia.
Al Khwarizmi, related to or from the region of Khwarazm, e.g. Muhammad ibn Musa al-Khwarizmi.
Al-Tikriti, related to or from the city of Tikrit, e.g. Saddam Hussein Abd al-Majid al-Tikriti, Abu Raita al-Takriti, Barzan Ibrahim al-Tikriti
Al Turki, related to or from the country of Turkey e.g. Abu Yusuf Al-Turki, Azjur al-Turki, Hassan Abdullah Hersi al-Turki, Hussain Al-Turki
Al Yemeni, related to or from the country of Yemen e.g. Abu Bara al Yemeni, Haitham al-Yemeni, Hussein al-Yemeni.
Al Hadrami, related to or from the region of Hadhramaut e.g. Al-Ala'a Al-Hadrami, Ahmed Al-Hadrami, Al-Imam al-Hadrami.
Al-Farsi or al-Farisi, related to or from the region of Pars (Fars) or the country of Persia; e.g. Salman Al-Farsi, Saud Al-Farsi, Abdulaziz Mohammed Majid Al-Farsi
Al Iraqi, related to or from the country of Iraq e.g. Fakhr-al-Din Iraqi, Abdul Hadi al Iraqi, Abu Ayoub al-Iraqi
Al Tunisi,  related to or from the country of Tunisia e.g. Abu Nasr al-Tunisi, Abu Osama al-Tunisi, Ali ibn Ziyad at-Tarabulsi al-Tunisi al-'Absi, Nabilah al-Tunisi
al-Andalusi, related to or from the region of Al-Andalus (modern day Iberia) e.g. Said al-Andalusi, Abū ʿAbdallāh Yaʿīsh ibn Ibrāhīm ibn Yūsuf ibn Simāk al-Andalusī al-Umawī
 al-Maghrebi, related to or from the region of Maghreb e.g. Ibn Yaḥyā al-Maghribī al-Samawʾal, Mahmud Sulayman al-Maghribi, Yusuf al-Maghribi.
Al-Shami, related to or from the region of Levant or from the country of Syria e.g. Nasser al-Shami, Husayn al-Shami, Abu Anas al-Shami, Abu Humam al-Shami.
Siraji, related to or from the district of Sirajganj in Bangladesh e.g. Ismail Hossain Siraji
Al-Lubnani, related to or from the country of Lebanon e.g. Bilal al-Berjawi al-Lubnani. 
Al-Kuwaiti, related to or from the country of Kuwait e.g. Abu Omar al-Kuwaiti, Abu Ahmed al-Kuwaiti, Jandal al-Kuwaiti.
Al Sindhi, related to or from the region of Sindh e.g. Mohammad Hayya Al-Sindhi
al-Razi – from Ray, Persia
al-Isfahani – from Isfahan, Persia
Islamabadi, related to or from the city of Chittagong (previously known as Islamabad) e.g. Maniruzzaman Islamabadi
al-Marwazi, from Marw, Khurasan
al-Rûmi – from Rûm (The Balkans and Asia Minor)
al-Rûmani, from Rome
al-Tiflisi, from Tiflis (Tbilisi), Georgia 
al-Tusi – from Tus, Khurasan, Persia
al-Khurasani – from Khurasan e.g. Abu Muslim, Abdallah ibn Tahir al-Khurasani
al-Tabari – from Tabaristan, Persia
al-Shirazi – from Shiraz, Fars, Persia
al-Hamadani, from Hamadan, Persia
al-Juzjani 
al-Sistani, al-Sijistani, al-Sajistani, al-Sijzi – from Sistan, Persia or Greater Iran
al-Qazwini – from Qazvin, Persia
al-Jurjani – from Jurjan, Persia
al-Astarabadi – from Astarabad (modern Gorgan), Persia
al-Darbandi, Darbandi - from Derbent, Persia
al Bukhari - from Bukhara, Uzbekistan
al-Daylami - from Daylam, northern Iran
al-Jannabi - from Jannaba port city, Arrajan province of Persia
al-Quhistani - from Quhistan
al-Nahawandi, al-Nihawandi - from Nahavand, Iran
al-Nisaburi, al-Naysaburi - from Nishapur, Iran
al-Qumisi, al-Kumisi - from Qumis, Iran
Maneri - from Maner Sharif, India, e.g. Makhdoom Yahya Maneri.
al-Bakkaniy - from the Royal Town of Pekan in the state of Pahang in Malaysia, Mohammad Faeez Harith al-Bakkaniy
al-Johori - from the state of Johor in Malaysia e.g. Ahmad bin Ya'kob al-Johori
at-Tranjanuwi - from the state of Terengganu in Malaysia e.g. Iskandar at-Tranjanuwi
al-Kedahi - from the state of Kedah in Malaysia e.g. Syeikh Mahmud al-Kedahi
al-Kalantani - from the state of Kelantan in Malaysia e.g. Syeikh Ismail bin Abdul Majid al-Kalantani, Syeikh Wan Ali bin Abdul Rahman al-Kalantani 
al-Ghari - Literally means cave in Arabic. From the district of Gua Musang (literally meaning Fox Cave in Malay) in the state of Kelantan in Malaysia, e.g. Zamihan al-Ghari
al-Tantawi - from Tanta, Egypt, e.g. Nasrudin Hasan Tantawi
al-Lusunji - from Losong, in Kuala Terengganu, Malaysia, e.g. Afif al-Lusunji
as-Sarawaki - from the state of Sarawak in Malaysia, e.g. Muhtar Suhaili As-Sarawaki 
as-Sembilani - from the state of Negeri Sembilan in Malaysia, e.g. Muhammad Musa al-Hafiz as-Sembilani
as-Subanji - from the city of Subang Jaya in the state of Selangor in Malaysia eg. Kamarul Afiq as-Subanji
al-Sinkili - from the town of Singkel in the province of Aceh in Indonesia Abd al-Rauf ibn Ali al-Fansuri al-Sinkili
al-Falembani - from a capital city in the province of South Sumatera in Indonesia, e.g. Abdul Samad Al-Falimbani
ar-Raniri - from the town of Rander, in Surat district in the state of Gujarat, India. eg. Nuruddin ar-Raniri
as-Sumatrani - from the island of Sumatera in Indonesia e.g. Syeikh Syamsuddin as-Sumatrani 
al-Fansuri - from the town of Pancur in the Central Tapanuli Regency in North Sumatera Indonesia eg Hamzah al-Fansuri
al-Fatani - from the province of Pattani in Thailand eg Syeikh Daud al-Fatani
as-Sambasi - from the regency of Sambas in Indonesia eg Muhammad Jabir as-Sambasi
al-Bantani - from the province of Banten in Indonesia eg Syeikh Abdur Rauf al-Bantani
al-Buthuni - from the island of Buton in Indonesia eg Haji Abdul Ghaniu al-Buthuni
as-Sumbawi - from the island of Sumbawa in Indonesia Syeikh Muhammad Zainuddin as-Sumbawi
al-Mankatsi from the city of Makassar in Indonesia eg Syeikh Yusuf Tajul Khalwati bin Abdullah al-Mankatsi
al-Filfulani - from the state of Penang in Malaysia eg Syeikh Zubeir al-Filfulani

 Tribes, clans or families 
Al Tamimi, from the tribe or clan of Bani Tamim. e.g. Modher Sadeq-Saba al-Tamimi, Talib al-Suhail al-Tamimi, Alaa al-Tamimi.
Al Qurashi, from the tribe or clan of Quraish. e.g. ibn Kathir Al-Qurashi, Abû 'Uthmân Sa'îd ibn Hakam al Qurashi.
Al Ta'i, from the tribe of Tai'. e.g. Hatem at-Ta'i.
Al Saud, from the family/house  of Saud. e.g. Saud bin Abdulaziz Al Saud, Al Jawhara bint Abdulaziz Al Saud, Muqrin bin Abdulaziz Al Saud, Abdulaziz ibn Abdul Rahman ibn Faisal ibn Turki ibn Abdullah ibn Muhammad Al Saud.
Ahl al-Bayt, from the People of the House.
al-Banjari, from the people of Banjar ethnicity in Indonesia e.g. Muhammad Arsyad bin Abdullah al-Banjari
al-Minankabawi - from the people of Minangkabau ethnicity in Indonesia eg Syeikh Ahmad Khatib al-Minankabawi, Syeikh Ismail Khalidi al-Minankabawi
al-Mandaili - from the people of Mandailing ethnicity in Indonesia eg Haji Abdur Rahman al-Mandaili

 People 
Al Maliki, related to Malik al-Ashtar. e.g. Nouri al-Maliki.
Al Farouqi, related to Farooq the Great. e.g. Ismail al-Faruqi.

Faith
 al-Majusi, with majus meaning "Zoroastrian"
 al-Falaki, with falak'' meaning “astronomy” e.g. Syeikh Tahir Jalaluddin al-Falaki

Multiples 
One can have more than one , one can be related to a city, a clan, a profession and a person at the same time. Examples include:
 Ali ibn Abi-Hazm al-Qarshi al-Dimashqi, from the tribe of Quraish and from Damascus (Dimashq).
 Abd al-Qahir ibn Tahir al-Tamimi al-Shafi`i al-Baghdadi, from the tribe of Bani Tamim, from the city of Baghdad and a follower of Muhammad ibn Idris ash-Shafi`i.
Makhdoom Yahya Maneri al-Suharwardi al-Hashimi al-Muttalabi, from the town of Maner Sharif, of the Sufi order Suhrawardiyya, of the tribe Banu Hashim and clan of Abd al-Muttalib. 
The  is optional but is quite widespread.

Examples
Ansari — from Ansar, Medina people who helped prophet Muhammad
Tabataba'i — someone who has two Seyyed as parents
Hanbali — someone following Hanbali Madhhab

See also
Arabic name
Kunya (Arabic)

References

 Nisba
 
 Nisba
 Nisba
Names by culture
 Nisba